The Missouri Tigers football statistical leaders are individual statistical leaders of the Missouri Tigers football program in various categories, including passing, rushing, receiving, total offense, defensive stats, and kicking. Within those areas, the lists identify single-game, single-season and career leaders. The Tigers represent the University of Missouri in the NCAA's Southeastern Conference (SEC).

Although Missouri began competing in intercollegiate football in 1890, the school's official record book considers the "modern era" to have begun in 1938. Records from before this year are often incomplete and inconsistent, and they are generally not included in these lists.

These lists are dominated by more recent players for several reasons:
 Since the 1930s, seasons have increased from  9 games to 10, 11, and then 12 games in length.
 Since 1996, Missouri has had the opportunity to play in a conference championship game (except in 2011), adding a potential extra game to the season. Missouri reached a conference championship game in 2007 and 2008 as a member of the Big 12 Conference, and 2013 and 2014 in the SEC.
 Bowl games only began counting toward single-season and career statistics in 2002.

These statistics are updated through the end of the 2020 season. The Missouri Football Record Book sometimes only lists a leader in certain statistics, rather than a top 10.

Passing

Passing yards

Passing touchdowns

Rushing

Rushing yards

Rushing touchdowns

Receiving

Receptions

Receiving yards

Receiving touchdowns

Total offense
Total offense is the sum of passing and rushing statistics. It does not include receiving or returns.

Total offense yards

Touchdowns responsible for
"Touchdowns responsible for" is the NCAA's official term for combined passing and rushing touchdowns.

Defense

Interceptions

Tackles

Sacks

Kicking

Field goals made

Field goal percentage

References

Missouri
Statistical Leaders
Missouri sports-related lists